The Devils Gate Limestone is a limestone geologic formation in Nevada.

It preserves fossils dating back to the Devonian period.

See also

 List of fossiliferous stratigraphic units in Nevada
 Paleontology in Nevada

References
 

Devonian geology of Nevada
Limestone formations of the United States
Devonian System of North America
Geologic formations of Nevada
Devonian southern paleotropical deposits